The Nokia 8.1, also known as the Nokia X7 in China, is a Nokia-branded mid-range smartphone by HMD Global. It was announced on 6 December 2018

References 

8.1
Mobile phones introduced in 2018
Mobile phones with multiple rear cameras
Discontinued smartphones